Thônes is a commune in the Haute-Savoie department in the Auvergne-Rhône-Alpes region in south-eastern France, and is the ″capital″ of local cheeses Reblochon and Chevrotin.

Geography
The Fier flows northwestward through the middle of the commune and traverses the village.

People
 Émile Paganon, Alpine guide and skier

See also
Communes of the Haute-Savoie department

References

Communes of Haute-Savoie